Angelica Bridges (born November 20, 1970) is an American actress, model, and singer. She was given a pictorial spread in Playboy magazine's November 2001 issue and featured as the issue's cover model.

In 2017, she competed on the first season of FOX's reality game show Kicking & Screaming with her survivalist partner Hakim Isler.

Career 
Bridges is the lead singer of the pop group Strawberry Blonde. She previously starred in The Luxor's show "Fantasy" in Las Vegas, albeit not as one of the dancers; she was the presenter and singer.

Personal life
Bridges married now-former NHL hockey player Sheldon Souray in 2002. Bridges filed for divorce in 2005, and the divorce was finalized in 2007. They have two daughters, Valentina and Scarlett.

Bridges sued Souray for $14 million in 2013, alleging "breach of implied contract, fraud and deceit and bad-faith denial of their marital agreement." Bridges alleged that Souray frequently beat and assaulted her during their marriage. Additionally, Souray was involved in multiple sexual affairs with other women while married, which led to their divorce. Bridges also alleged that Souray abused their two children physically and emotionally, to the point that one of their daughters has had several extended stays in a hospital psychiatric unit, all before the age of 10.

Bridges appeared in a 2016 episode of Million Dollar Matchmaker (S1E10), where she revealed her emotional scars and trauma that were the result of her abusive five-year marriage to Souray.

Filmography

See also
 FHM 100 Sexiest Women in the World 1998
 FHM-US's 100 Sexiest Women 2003
 List of people in Playboy 2000–2009

References

External links
 
 Angelica Bridges - Official site for Angelica Bridges

Living people
American film actresses
American female models
American soap opera actresses
American television actresses
20th-century American actresses
21st-century American actresses
1970 births
Place of birth missing (living people)
Participants in American reality television series